The Bay Area Climate Collaborative (BACC) is an initiative of the Silicon Valley Leadership Group through its Sustainable Valley Foundation. It was established on March 6, 2009. The mayors of San Francisco (Gavin Newsom), San Jose (Chuck Reed) and Oakland (Ron Dellums) launched the BACC with the Silicon Valley Leadership Group and business and civic leaders. The BACC created a 10-point action plan that aims to improves solar energy, energy efficiency, electric vehicles, and green jobs.

History

The Bay Area Climate Collaborative (BACC) was founded on March 6, 2009, at the signing of the Bay Area Climate Compact. The signing ceremony was held in Redwood City at Silver Spring Networks, and was attended by leaders of local governments, agencies and businesses, as well as members of the press.

Partners at time of launch included: 
City of Oakland
City of San Francisco
City of San Jose
Silicon Valley Leadership Group
Bay Area Council
Joint Venture Silicon Valley

Compact
In 2006, The Bay Area Climate Compact (BACC) was signed by the Cities of San Francisco, San Jose, and Oakland. The compact states that cities commit to creating a public-private identity that best serves the region, its municipalities, institutions, and communities to meet the state of California's goals for reducing greenhouse gas emissions (Global Warming Solutions Act of 2006). The compact also stated its dedication to helping Bay Area communities prepare for and adapt to the impacts of climate change.

As of August 2010, 15 regional municipalities had signed the Bay Area Climate Compact.

References

External links

 Climate Change Compact
 Silicon Valley Leadership Group

Silicon Valley
Climate change organizations based in the United States
Environmental organizations based in the San Francisco Bay Area